Kent Carter (born June 14, 1939 in Hanover, New Hampshire) is an American jazz bassist. His father, Alan Carter, founded the Vermont Symphony Orchestra. He is also the grandson of American artist, Rockwell Kent. He worked in Steve Lacy's group, played on the two Jazz Composer's Orchestra albums and released albums for Emanem Records.

Discography

As leader
 Beauvais Cathedral (Emanem, 1976)
 Lost in June (Ictus, 1977)
 The Willisau Suites (Emanem, 1984)
 The Juillaguet Collection (Emanem, 1996)
 Intersections (Emanem, 2006)
 Summer Works 2009 (Emanem, 2010) 
 Oratorios and Songs (Emanem, 2010)

As sideman
With Paul Bley
 Touching (Debut, 1965)
With Don Cherry
 The Summer House Sessions (Blank Forms, 2021)
With the Jazz Composer's Orchestra
 Communication (JCOA, 1965)
 The Jazz Composer's Orchestra (JCOA, 1968)
With Steve Lacy
 Disposability (RCA, 1966)
 Journey Without End with Mal Waldron (RCA Victor, 1971)
 Mal Waldron with the Steve Lacy Quintet (America, 1972)
 Trickles (Black Saint, 1976)
 Troubles (Black Saint, 1977)
 Stamps (HatHut, 1979)
 The Way (HatHut, 1979 [1980])
With Gianni Lenoci
 Secret Garden (Silta)
With Roswell Rudd
 Regeneration (Soul Note, 1982)
With the Spontaneous Music Ensemble
 Quintessence (Emanem, 1974 [1986])
With Noah Howard
 Live in Europe - Vol. 1 (Sun Records, 1975)
With Un Drame Musical Instantané
 A Travail égal salaire égal (Grrr, 1982)
With Alan Silva
Seasons (BYG, 1971)

External links
 "Summer Works 2009" review

References

Living people
1939 births
American jazz double-bassists
Male double-bassists
Emanem Records artists
People from Hanover, New Hampshire
Musicians from New Hampshire
21st-century double-bassists
21st-century American male musicians
American male jazz musicians
Spontaneous Music Ensemble members
Incus Records artists
NoBusiness Records artists